Nicolás Geovanny Asencio Espinoza (born April 26, 1975) is an Ecuadorian former football striker.

He played for several clubs, including his beloved Barcelona de Guayaquil. In Ecuador he also played for Aucas, El Nacional, Deportivo Cuenca, Macará and Deportivo Quito, in Mexico for Tecos UAG, in Colombia for Millonarios, in Chile for Cobreloa and also in Bolivia for Wilstermann.

National team
Asencio played for the Ecuador national football team between 1995 and 2003 earning a total of 20 caps including one in the 2002 FIFA World Cup.

After football
After his retirement, Asencio worked as Sport Director for Barcelona SC until 2021. Next, he joined Guayaquil Sport with the same charge.

Honours

Club
Barcelona SC
Ecuadorian Serie A: 

Deportivo Quito
Ecuadorian Serie A: 2009

International
 
 Canada Cup: 1999

References

External links

Nicolás Asencio at Playmakerstats.com

1975 births
Living people
People from Machala
Ecuadorian footballers
Ecuador international footballers
Ecuadorian expatriate footballers
1995 Copa América players
1999 Copa América players
2002 CONCACAF Gold Cup players
2002 FIFA World Cup players
Barcelona S.C. footballers
S.D. Aucas footballers
Tecos F.C. footballers
Ferro Carril Oeste footballers
Millonarios F.C. players
Tampico Madero F.C. footballers
C.D. El Nacional footballers
C.D. Cuenca footballers
Cobreloa footballers
C.D. Jorge Wilstermann players
C.S.D. Macará footballers
S.D. Quito footballers
C.D. ESPOLI footballers
Ecuadorian Serie A players
Chilean Primera División players
Argentine Primera División players
Categoría Primera A players
Ecuadorian Serie B players
Ecuadorian expatriate sportspeople in Mexico
Expatriate footballers in Mexico
Ecuadorian expatriate sportspeople in Argentina
Expatriate footballers in Argentina
Ecuadorian expatriate sportspeople in Colombia
Expatriate footballers in Colombia
Ecuadorian expatriate sportspeople in Chile
Expatriate footballers in Chile
Ecuadorian expatriate sportspeople in Bolivia
Expatriate footballers in Bolivia
Association football forwards